Donald Ray January (born November 20, 1929) is an American retired professional golfer, best known for winning the 1967 PGA Championship.

Early life
Born in Plainview, Texas, January graduated from Sunset High School in Dallas. He was a member of the North Texas State golf team that won four consecutive NCAA Division I titles from 1949 to 1952. January is a Member of the Sunset High School Hall of Fame.

While in college as a sophomore, as part of his scholarship, January helped teach a beginning golf class, where he met his future wife, Patricia "Pat" Rushing. They both graduated in 1953 and eloped to Ardmore, Oklahoma. They lived in San Antonio while Don was in the Air Force, and began their family—two boys and a girl.

Professional career
January won 10 PGA Tour titles, though never more than one in a year, with his most notable at the 1967 PGA Championship, an 18-hole playoff victory over Don Massengale. January had lost the 1961 PGA Championship in a playoff to Jerry Barber when his 68, the lowest losing score ever in an 18-hole playoff for a major championship, was bested by Barber's 67. He won the Vardon Trophy for lowest scoring average in 1976 at the age of 47. He was a member of the U.S. Ryder Cup team in both 1965 and 1977.

January was responsible for a change to the Rules of Golf. During the 1963 Phoenix Open, January had a putt roll up to the lip of the hole and stop. January claimed that the ball was still moving, and waited for seven minutes for the ball to drop (it never did). Rule 16-2 was revised in 1964 to state that players had to tap the ball in within ten seconds or be penalized.

In the period between his last PGA Tour win and the start of the Senior PGA Tour, January devoted most of his professional efforts to a golf course design business, JanMart Enterprises, that he had established with fellow Texan and PGA Tour golfer Billy Martindale.

January is well known for his success on the Senior PGA Tour (now the Champions Tour), winning 22 events including two PGA Seniors' Championships. In 1980, he won the first official event on the Senior PGA Tour—the Atlantic City Senior International.

The Don January Golf Classic is a golf tournament played annually in the spring that was established to honor him in 1990 by his alma mater, now known as the University of North Texas.

In early 1961, January appeared as himself on the March 6 episode of the game show To Tell the Truth. He received two votes.

Professional wins (45)

PGA Tour wins (10)

PGA Tour playoff record (3–5)

Other wins (2)
This list may be incomplete
1956 Apple Valley Clambake
1959 Valencia Open Invitational

Senior PGA Tour wins (22)

*Note: The 1985 United Hospitals Senior Golf Championship was shortened to 36 holes due to rain.

Senior PGA Tour playoff record (4–1)

Other senior wins (12)
1979 PGA Seniors' Championship
1980 Australian Seniors Championship
1982 Liberty Mutual Legends of Golf (with Sam Snead)
1984 Shootout at Jeremy Ranch (with Mike Sullivan)
1985 Liberty Mutual Legends of Golf (with Gene Littler), Mazda Champions (with Alice Miller)
1986 Liberty Mutual Legends of Golf (with Gene Littler)
1993 Liberty Mutual Legends of Golf – Legendary Division
1994 Liberty Mutual Legends of Golf – Legendary Division (with Gene Littler)
1997 Liberty Mutual Legends of Golf – Legendary Division (with Gene Littler)
2001 Liberty Mutual Legends of Golf – Demaret Division (with Gene Littler)
2004 Liberty Mutual Legends of Golf – Demaret Division (with Gene Littler)

Major championships

Wins (1)

1Defeated Massengale in an 18-hole playoff, 69 to 71.

Results timeline

Note: January never played in The Open Championship.

CUT = missed the halfway cut (3rd round cut in 1964 PGA Championship)
WD = withdrew
"T" indicates a tie for a place

Summary

Most consecutive cuts made – 10 (twice)
Longest streak of top-10s – 3 (1976 PGA – 1977 PGA)

Champions Tour major championships

Wins (1)

U.S. national team appearances
Professional
Ryder Cup: 1965 (winners), 1977 (winners)

See also
List of golfers with most PGA Tour Champions wins
List of men's major championships winning golfers

References

External links

American male golfers
North Texas Mean Green men's golfers
PGA Tour golfers
PGA Tour Champions golfers
Ryder Cup competitors for the United States
Winners of men's major golf championships
Winners of senior major golf championships
Golf course architects
Golfers from Texas
People from Plainview, Texas
1929 births
Living people